Buldhana district (Marathi pronunciation: [bulɖʰaːɳa]) is located in the Amravati division of Maharashtra, India.
It is situated at the western border of Vidarbha region and is 500 km away from the state capital, Mumbai. The district has towns and cities like Shegaon, Jalgaon Jamod, Malkapur, Khamgaon, Lonar, Mehkar, and Chikhli. It is surrounded by Madhya Pradesh in the north, Akola, Washim, and Amravati districts on the east, Jalna district on the south, and Jalgaon and Aurangabad districts on the west. Khamgaon is the largest city in the district. Latitudes are 19.51° to 21.17° N and longitudes are 75.57° to 76.59° E.

Buldhana district holds religious significance as it is the site of the Shri Gajanan Maharaj Temple, Shegaon.

Lonarkar Top (about 923 meters) is highest altitude in Buldhana District placed in Ambabarwa Wildlife Sanctuary.

Officer

Members of Parliament
 
Prataprao Ganpatrao Jadhav (BJP) 
Raksha Khadse (BJP)

Guardian Minister

list of Guardian Minister

District Magistrate/Collector

list of District Magistrate / Collector

History
The name of the district is probably derived from Bhil Thana (place of Bhils, a tribal group). 

Buldhana, along with the rest of Berar Province, was part of the Vidarbha kingdom mentioned in the Mahabharata, a Sanskrit epic poem. Berar formed a part of the Maurya Empire during the reign of Ashoka (272–231 BCE). Berar came under the rule of the Satavahana dynasty (2nd century BCE–2nd century CE), the Vakataka dynasty (3rd to 6th centuries), the Chalukya dynasty (6th to 8th centuries), the Rashtrakuta Dynasty (8th to 10th centuries), the Chalukyas again (10th to 12th centuries), and finally the Yadava dynasty of Devagiri (late 12th to early 14th centuries).

A period of Muslim rule began when Alauddin Khalji, the Sultan of Delhi conquered the region in the early 14th century. The region was part of the Bahmani Sultanate, which broke away from the Delhi Sultanate in the mid-14th century. The Bahmani Sultanate broke up into smaller sultanates at the end of the 15th century. In 1572, Berar became part of the Nizam Shahi sultanate, based at Ahmednagar. The Nizam Shahis ceded Berar to the Mughal Empire in 1595. As Mughal rule started to unravel at the start of the 18th century, Asaf Jah I, the Nizam of Hyderabad, seized the southern provinces of the empire in 1724, forming an independent state. Berar was a part of the independent state.

In 1853, the whole district came under the administration of the British East India Company. Berar was divided into East and West Berar with Buldhana district being included in West Berar. In 1903, Berar was leased by the Nizam of Hyderabad to the British Government of India. Thus, Berar became part of Central Provinces. In 1950, it became part of Madhya Pradesh with Nagpur as its capital. In 1956, along with other Marathi-speaking regions of Vidarbha, it became part of the newly formed state Maharashtra in 1960.

Administration

Sub-Divisions
The district has six revenue sub-divisions headed by a Sub Divisional Officer (SDO): Buldhana, Mehkar, Khamgaon, Malkapur, Jalgaon-Jamod, and Sindkhedraja.

Tehsils
As of 2010, the district of Buldhana comprises thirteen talukas (tehsils): Buldhana, Chikhli, Deulgaon Raja, Malkapur, Motala, Nandura, Mehkar, Sindkhed Raja, Lonar, Khamgaon, Shegaon, Jalgaon Jamod, and Sangrampur.

Agriculture
The district superintending agriculture officer comes under the Divisional Joint Director of Amravati Division. There are three sub-divisions at Buldhana, Khamgaon, and Mehkar with a taluka agriculture officer posted at each taluka.

There are multiple circles under each taluka. They are Dhad, Shelapur, Dhamangaon, Motala, Shelsur, Amdapur, Chikhli, Dharangaon, Malkapur, Janephal, Mehkar, Bibi, Lonar, Sakharkherda, Sindkhed Raja, Mera Khurd, Deulgaon Mahi, Deulgaon Raja, Ganeshpur, Pimpalgaon Raja (Khamgaon), Nandura, Shegaon, Jalgaon Jamod, Warwat Khanderao, and Sangrampur.

Police
The district has six police subdivisions and thirty-three police stations.

Electricity
The distribution of electricity comes under Akola Zone and Buldhana Circle with Buldhana, Khamgaon, and Malkapur Divisions. Each subdivision caters to more nearby talukas and has 33KV distribution substations under them.

Irrigation
The district comes under Buldhana Irrigation Project Circle along with Akola and Washim district. The circle comes under Vidarbha Irrigation Development Corporation, Nagpur. It has its Major Project division at Shegaon, Kadakpurna at Deulgaon Raja, Mun Project division at Khamgaon, and Minor Irrigation Division at Chikhli and Akola.

The completed irrigation projects are the Nalganga Dam project in Motala and a major project in Vaan having one-fourth of the benefit accrue to Akola district. Many further irrigation projects are under way or are in the planning stages.

Public Works Department
The district comes under Amravati Public Works Region and Akola Public Works Circle. It has one Public Works division at Buldhana with subdivision at Buldhana, Chikhli, Mehkar, and Deulgaon Raja; and a second, Khamgaon division, with subdivisions at Khamgaon, Jalgaon Jamod, and Malkapur; plus the Buldhana District Mechanical Subdivision.

There are Road Project subdivisions at Buldhana and Khamgaon under the Road Project Division of Akola. There is a separate Zilla Parishad Works Division at Buldhana with subdivisions at Buldhana, Kahmgaon, Mehkar, and Malkapur. The department manages Government Rest houses at Buldhana, Khamgaon, Shegaon, Malkapur, Motala, Jalgaon Jamod, Sangrampur, Chikhli, Amdapur, Lavhala (Mehkar), Mehkar, Dongaon, Deulgaon Raja, Deulgaon Mahi, Sindkhed Raja, Lonar, and Nandura.

Politics
The district contributes one seat to the Lok Sabha (Lower House), namely Buldhana (Lok Sabha constituency). Prataprao Ganpatrao Jadhav of Shiv Sena is the current Member of Parliament from Buldhana.

The district has seven seats in the Maharashtra State legislature assembly: Buldhana, Chikhli, Sindkhed Raja, Mehkar, Khamgaon, and Jalgaon Jamod. The seventh seat at Malkapur is part of Raver (Lok Sabha constituency) in Jalgaon district.

Office Bearers

Members of Parliament 
Prataprao Ganpatrao Jadhav (SHINDE GUT)
Raksha Khadse (BJP)

Guardian Ministers

District Magistrate/Collector

Demographics

According to the 2011 census Buldhana district has a population of 2,586,258, roughly equal to the nation of Kuwait or the US state of Nevada. This gives it a ranking of 159th in India (out of a total of 640). Its population growth rate over the decade 2001-2011 was 15.93%. Buldhana has a sex ratio of 928 females for every 1000 males, and a literacy rate of 82.09%. Scheduled Castes and Scheduled Tribes maake up 18.21% and 4.39% of the population respectively.

Religion

Languages 

At the time of the 2011 Census of India, 78.67% of the population in the district spoke Marathi, 10.99% Urdu, 4.41% Hindi and 2.11% Lambadi as their first language.

Residents of Buldhana communicate in Marathi language. Nihali language, a language isolate of India, is spoken by some 2,000 people (1991) in the Buldhana district of Maharashtra. Apart from the commonly used Varhadi, a dialect of Marathi language used in the district includes Andh, an Indo-Aryan language spoken by 100,000 people. Hindi and English are also spoken in the region.

Geography

Rivers
The district lies in the Tapi River and Godavari River basins. Purna River is a tributary of the Tapi River. Nalganga river is a tributary of Purna river. The Penganga and Khadakpurna rivers are tributaries of Godavari River.

Here are the rivers in the district, with their tributaries.

 Purna River
 Vaan River
 Mann River
 Utawali River
 Nipani River
 Mas River
 Bordi River
 Dnyanganga River
 Vishwaganga River
 Nalganga River
 Painganga River
 Khadakpurna River
 Dhamana River
 Koradi River
 Jamvani River
 Tapi River

Transport
Buses, jeeps, two-wheelers, and railways are the common modes of transport.

Road

National Highway 53 passes through Khamgaon, Nandura, and Malkapur towns in the district and Aurangabad-Buldhana National Highway 753A. There are many Maharashtra State Road Transport Corporation bus stands in all towns of the district. There are State Transport bus depots at Buldhana, Malkapur, Chikhli, Mehkar, Khamgaon, Shegaon, and Jalgaon-Jamod.

Vehicles from Nagpur, Amravati, and Akola pass through Khamgaon, Chikhli, Deulgaonraja while going towards Jalna, Aurangabad, and Pune. Regular State Transport buses are available from any Maharashtra State Road Transport Corporation Bus Stand.
National Highway 53 passes through Khamgaon, Nandura, and Malkapur Talukas in Buldhana District.

Vehicles Nagpur, Karanja Murtizapur pass through Mehkar and Sindkhed Raja on Mumbai–Nagpur Expressway while going towards jalna, Aurangabad and Mumbai and Government of India also planned Mumbai Nagpur High Speed rail corridor  through along with Mumbai Nagpur Expressway it goes through district Buldhana and Mehkar will be upcoming High Speed Railway Station

Rail
Malkapur, Nandura, and Shegaon railway stations fall under the Bhusawal-Badnera Section of Bhusawal Division of the Central Railway. The nearest railway station is at Malkapur which is 45 km from District Headquarters. Malkapur, Shegaon, Nandura railway stations come under Bhusawal Division of Central Railway. Bhusawal (101 km) and Akola (102 km) are also the nearest railway junctions from the District headquarters. There is a branch line from Jalamb to Khamgaon. The main line was originally under the Great Indian Peninsula Railway and the branch line between Jalamb and Khamgaon was under the Khamgaon State Railway.

The railway stations in the district, with their codes, are Khamkhed (KMKD), Malkapur (MKU), Wadoda (WDD), Biswa Bridge (BIS), Nandura (NN), Kumgaon Burti (KJL), Jalamb Junction (JM), Khamgaon (KMN), Shegaon (SEG), and Shrikshetra Nagzari (NGZ).

A computerized railway reservation facility is available at Buldhana, Malkapur, and Shegaon, while manual reservation facility is available at city booking office, Khamgaon, Nandura, and Jalamb Junction.

Airport
The nearest airport is at Akola (not functional), which is 102 km from district headquarters.
However, the nearest functional airport is at Aurangabad at a distance of 145 km.

Economy
Cotton, sorghum and other cereals, oilseeds, soybean, sunflower, and groundnuts are the predominant crops grown in the district.

Khamgaon and Malkapur are the major cotton trading towns in the district. The district has many minor and medium size irrigation projects. The important ones are Nalganga and Vaan. There are thirteen Agriculture Produce Market Committees-Main Market, one in each tehsil, and there are twenty sub-markets in the districts.

The Indian Council for Agriculture research funded a farm science centre Krishi Vigyan Kendra, Jalgaon Jamod in the district in 1994.

The district has major industrial areas at Khamgoan and Malkapur and has smaller industrial areas at Chikhli, Buldhana, Dasarkhed, Deoulgaonraja, Mehkar, Sangrampur, and Lonar.

Culture
There is a fair called Chaitra Masa Suklapaksha Navami at Shegaon on Rama Navami in Chaitra (March or April) each year.

Common folk arts are Bhajan (devotional singing), Kirtan (devotional chanting with musical instruments), and Gondhal (a complex art form involving ritual acts, dances, songs, and poems).

Youth Hostel Buldhana is one of two youth hostels in Maharashtra and is located near Zilla Krida Sankulan with a 50-bed dormitory and five double rooms.

Places of interest

Lonar Lake

Lonar Crater Lake is located in Buldhana district. It is the second largest impact crater in basaltic rock in the world. It was formed 60,000 years ago by a meteor impact. The pH of the water is about 11 (extremely alkaline). Lonar Crater has very different flora and fauna in its vicinity.

Lonar Altitude is on 563 meters.

Sant Gajanan Maharaj Temple

Gajanan Maharaj from Shegaon, was a saint from India. "Shri Sant Gajanan Maharaj Sansthan", a body of 12 trustees was formed on 12 September 1908 to commemorate the holy place which the saint had hinted about, for Samadhi. Later, a temple was built around his Samadhi/tomb.

This temple has a tourist attraction called "Anand Sagar", an INR 3 billion project completed in 2005. It is maintained by the Gajanan Maharaj Sansthan. It surrounds a big artificial lake. It has a meditation center, an aquarium, temples, playgrounds, lawns and open theatre where fountain-show is conducted for entertainment. It has been decorated with artifacts and carvings. An amusement park has also started with a toy train encircling the entire place.

Sindkhed Raja

Sindkhed Raja is birthplace of Jijabai, mother of Chhatrapati Shivaji, the town still has the palace and tomb of Lakhuji Raje Jadhav, father of Jijabai.

Pentakali Dam

 Pentakali Dam is an earthfill dam on Painganga River near Mehkar, Buldhana district. It is located at 53 km from Buldhana and 21 km from Mehkar.

Other
 Hemadpanthi temples are located at Mehkar-Sonati, Sindhkhed Raja (Nilkantheshwar)
 Nalganga Dam in Malkapur.

References

External links

 Buldhana district website
 Buldhana district map
 Lonar_Lake Lonar crater
 Anuradha College of Engineering
 Jawahar Navodaya Vidyalaya, Shegaon
 Krishi Vigyan Kendra, Jalgaon Jamod 
 Vivekanand Ashram, Hiwara Ashram, Tq. Mehkar
 District official website

 
Districts of Maharashtra
Amravati division
1867 establishments in India
Minority Concentrated Districts in India
Vidarbha